Gregory John Fasala (born 10 May 1965) is an Australian former sprint freestyle swimmer of the 1980s, who won a silver medal in the 4×100-metre freestyle relay at the 1984 Summer Olympics in Los Angeles.

Coming from Victoria, Fasala was best known for being a member of the so-called Mean Machine. Debuting at the 1982 Commonwealth Games in Brisbane, Fasala combined with Neil Brooks, Michael Delany and Graeme Brewer to claim gold in the 4×100-metre freestyle relay, gaining their nickname after collectively shaving their heads for the race.  In the individual event, he claimed silver behind Brooks.

In Los Angeles, he competed only in the relay, combining with Delaney, Brooks and Mark Stockwell to claim silver behind the United States team.  At the 1986 Commonwealth Games in Edinburgh, Scotland, Fasala claimed gold in the 100-metre freestyle and the 4×100-metre freestyle relay.

He was an Australian Institute of Sport scholarship holder.

See also
 List of Commonwealth Games medallists in swimming (men)
 List of Olympic medalists in swimming (men)

References

External links
 
 
 

1965 births
Living people
Australian male freestyle swimmers
Olympic swimmers of Australia
Olympic silver medalists for Australia
Sportsmen from Victoria (Australia)
Swimmers at the 1984 Summer Olympics
Swimmers at the 1982 Commonwealth Games
Swimmers at the 1986 Commonwealth Games
Commonwealth Games gold medallists for Australia
Commonwealth Games silver medallists for Australia
Commonwealth Games bronze medallists for Australia
Australian Institute of Sport swimmers
Medalists at the 1984 Summer Olympics
Olympic silver medalists in swimming
Commonwealth Games medallists in swimming
20th-century Australian people
Medallists at the 1982 Commonwealth Games
Medallists at the 1986 Commonwealth Games